Dr. Serge Carrière, OC  is a Canadian physiologist, physician and educator.

He was born on July 21, 1934, in Montreal, Quebec. He studied at the Université de Montréal, taking his B.A. in 1954 and his M.D. in 1959. In 1962, he joined the Harvard Medical School as an instructor in physiology from 1962 to 1964. He returned to Montreal to begin his own practice and began teaching at the Université de Montréal.

In 1997, he received the Order of Canada.

 research

Throughout his career, Dr. Carrière has conducted extensive laboratory and clinical research

References

1934 births
Living people
Chief operating officers
French Quebecers
Harvard Medical School faculty
Université de Montréal alumni
People from Montreal
Officers of the Order of Canada